Laura Sogar (born 27 April 1991) is an American swimmer. She is a two times medal winner representing United States at the FINA World Swimming Championships in 2012 and swims for University of Texas at the United States Short Course Swimming Championships, a domestic and national level swimming championship in USA.

College career 
She also holds the American national record for the women's 200m breaststroke event when she established the record for Texas in 2012.

Sogar also claimed a gold medal in her college career for the University of Texas at the 2013 NCAA Division I Women's Swimming and Diving Championships in the women's 200m breaststroke event.

Career 
She competed at the 2008 FINA Youth World Swimming Championships in her youth career claiming 3 medals including a gold medal in the Girl's 4 × 100 m relay medley event.

She then went to represent the United States swimming team in senior level competitions in late 2012 after competing at the 2012 FINA World Swimming Championships which was held in Turkey. She claimed a silver medal in the women's 200m breaststroke event and secured a bronze medal in the women's 4 × 100 m relay medley event.

References 

1991 births
Living people
American female swimmers
People from Dallas
Universiade medalists in swimming
Universiade silver medalists for the United States
Universiade bronze medalists for the United States
Medalists at the 2013 Summer Universiade
21st-century American women